Windward Performance is an aircraft design house and manufacturer located in  Bend, Oregon. The company is owned and led by Greg Cole. Windward Performance has helped numerous companies with technical expertise and in house they designed and developed the SparrowHawk ultralight sailplane and the DuckHawk high strength, high performance 15m sailplane.

The company also designed and built the Perlan II stratospheric glider which now holds the sailplane world altitude record at 52,172 ft.

References

External links
 Windward Performance

Aircraft manufacturers of the United States
Companies based in Bend, Oregon